Jana Hubinská (born 7 June 1964) is a Slovak film and stage actress. She won a Czech Lion for Best Supporting Actress at the 2002 Czech Lion Awards, for her role in the film Girlie. She has performed in theatres such as Divadlo West in Bratislava and the Theatre on the Balustrade in Prague.

Selected filmography
Girlie (2002)
Pupendo (2003)
Wrong Side Up (2005)
 Revival (2013)

References

External links

1964 births
Living people
Slovak film actresses
Slovak stage actresses
Czechoslovak film actresses
Czechoslovak stage actresses
Actors from Bratislava
20th-century Slovak actresses
21st-century Slovak actresses
Czech Lion Awards winners